Joseph Van Beeck (18 February 1911 – 8 February 1998) was a Belgian footballer. He played in 16 matches for the Belgium national football team from 1930 to 1935, scoring seven goals.

References

External links
 

1911 births
1998 deaths
Belgian footballers
Belgium international footballers
Place of birth missing
Association football forwards